Drangovo is a village in Kirkovo Municipality, Kardzhali Province, southern Bulgaria.

Drangovo has two ancient Roman bridges, one in the center, one at a tributary of Drangovskko river close by. The second was destroyed by treasure hunters in February 2016 illegally digging for legendary gold treasures.

References

Villages in Kardzhali Province